Scribble Jam was an annual hip hop music festival hosted in Cincinnati, Ohio. Dubbed "America's largest hip hop festival", sort of like Woodstock. It was co-founded in 1996 by "Fat" Nick Accurso, and Jason Brunson, founders of graffiti magazine Scribble, and DJ Mr Dibbs, in the parking lot of a local nightclub. The following year's event benefitted from better publicity, and included MC, DJ and breakdance battles for the first time.

In 2000, with the addition of new partners Tony Heitz and Pase Rock, the festival grew in popularity, as tens of thousands of hip hop fans flocked to its grounds in early August. It has been known to attract up to 20,000 fans. In early April 2010, Scribble Jam organizer Kevin Beacham confirmed the persistent rumors that the event would no longer continue, citing the struggling economy and difficulty in securing funding as reasons.

For most of its existence, Scribble Jam refused corporate sponsorship, which Accurso explained as an attempt to keep the festival from being run by "those who don't understand [hip hop] culture", adding that outside marketing or promotion would "defeat the purpose" of the festival. By 2003, however, the festival had started accepting some corporate sponsors; that year's event was backed by Toyota/Scion.

Competition
The centerpieces of the Scribble Jam festival are the five competitions, four of which are designed to highlight the main aspects of hip hop culture. They include the emcee competition or freestyle battle, the DJ battle or scratching competition, the B-boy battle or breakdancing competition, the graff-writer or graffiti competition, and  the beatbox competition. Historically, the most popular of the competitions has been the freestyle battle, although all aspects of hip hop culture are well represented. The festival expanded its initial 1996  emcee and b-boy competitions to include the DJ competition in 1998. In 2003 the beatbox competition was added to the line-up. In the last five years of the festival a Production competition was added to the festival line-up, and there were performances by guests including KRS-One, Eminem, Sage Francis, Atmosphere, Blueprint, Eyedea, Mr Dibbs, Little Brother and Living Legends  which greatly increased the festival's popularity.

Past winners
As of Scribble Jam's conclusion in 2008 there have been thirteen emcee champions, eleven DJ champions, thirteen B-Boy champions, and six beatbox champions.

Emcee battle
1996 - Vendetta 
1997 - Juice
1998 - Adeem
1999 - Eyedea
2000 - Sage Francis (as Xaul Zan)
2001 - Adeem
2002 - Mac Lethal
2003 - Rhymefest
2004 - illmaculate
2005 - Justice
2006 - The Saurus
2007 - Nocando
2008 - The Saurus

DJ competition
1998 - DJ Precyse
1999 - DJ Precyse
2000 - DJ Precyse
2001 - DJ Sprite
2002 - DJ Skwint
2003 - Skratch Bastid
2004 - Skratch Bastid
2005 - Spare Change
2006 - I-Dee
2007 - Skratch Bastid
2008 - DJ T-Lo

B-boy competition
1996 - Forrest Getemgump (individual)
1997 - Self-Explanatory
1998 - Phase II
1999 - Midwest Junkie Cats (group with members of the Junkwartz and the Battlecats)
2000 - Junkwartz
2001 - Motion Disorderz
2002 - Motion Disorderz
2003 - Motion Disorderz
2004 - Motion Disorderz
2005 - Brickheadz
2006 - Brickheadz
2007 - Motion Disorderz
2008 - Brickheadz

Beatbox battle
2003 - A Train
2004 - A Train
2005 - J.Beetz (from SICK.SOUND.SYNDROME)
2006 - DJ Snuggles
2007 - Poizunus 
2008 - Scott Jackson

There are only two production champions listed on the official Scribble Jam website: 
2008 - Optiks
2007 - X:144

External links
 Riding Shotgun-Life at Scribble Jam

See also
List of hip hop music festivals
Hip hop culture
Underground hip hop

References

Music festivals in Ohio
Hip hop music festivals in the United States
Music festivals established in 1996
Music of Cincinnati
Festivals in Cincinnati